Nicholas Blechman is an American illustrator and graphic designer. He is known for his distinctive minimal line style and use of simple geometric shapes in graphic design and illustration.

Career 
His work has appeared on The New Yorker, Travel + Leisure, GQ, Wired and The New York Times. Blechman has been awarded the Cynthia Hazen Polsky and Leon Polsky Rome Prize in Design, the Richard Gangel Art Director Award and a residency at the American Academy.

He has published, edited, and designed the political underground magazine NOZONE.

Works 
 Night Light - Orchard Books, 2003
 Chip Kidd, Christoph Niemann -100% Evil - Princeton Architectural Press

See also 
 Christoph Niemann

References 

American illustrators
American graphic designers
Living people
Year of birth missing (living people)